Euchromia gemmata is a moth of the subfamily Arctiinae. It was described by Arthur Gardiner Butler in 1887. It is found on the Solomon Islands.

References

 Arctiidae genus list at Butterflies and Moths of the World of the Natural History Museum

Moths described in 1887
Euchromiina